Line C of the Lyon Metro is the modern incarnation of the Funiculaire Croix-Rousse - Croix-Paquet (Croix-Rousse - Croix-Paquet Funicular), an old cable-hauled railway operating on part of the current alignment.

In 1891, the original funicular line was opened, running between its namesake stations. After surviving the closure of the nearby funiculaire Rue Terme - Croix-Rousse in 1967, this line closed in 1972 for refurbishment and conversion to rack railway technology, reopening for service in 1974 (four years before lines A and B opened). When it was integrated with the metro as Lyon Metro Line C in 1978, the line's southern end was extended from Croix-Paquet to Hôtel-de-Ville (City Hall), also equipped with rack rail. A further extension of Line C opened on December 8, 1984, when its northern end was extended from Croix-Rousse to Cuire as an adhesion railway (no rack).

It was constructed using various methods: the original route used by the former funicular line runs up a steep incline rising from a deep tunnel to an exposed trench, the newly built level segment at Croix-Rousse using cut-and-cover, and the latest section beyond Hénon running on the surface. Croix Paquet station claims to be the steepest metro station in the world, with an incline of 17%. The repurposed alignment of the original funicular from Croix-Paquet to Croix-Rousse is among the world's oldest structures currently used by metro trains, having first opened in 1891.

List of the stations
 Hôtel de Ville - Louis Pradel
 Croix-Paquet
 Croix-Rousse
 Hénon
 Cuire

Chronology

 December 9, 1974: Croix-Paquet—Croix-Rousse
 May 2, 1978: Hôtel de Ville - Louis Pradel—Croix-Rousse
 December 10, 1984: Hôtel de Ville - Louis Pradel—Cuire

References

External links
 Transports en Commun Lyonnais (TCL)

1st arrondissement of Lyon
4th arrondissement of Lyon
Rack railways in France
Railway lines opened in 1862
Railway lines opened in 1978
C
1862 establishments in France